Negotiations is the fifth full-length album by the Beaverton, Oregon-based band The Helio Sequence, and their third release on US label Sub Pop. It was released on September 11, 2012. On May 1, 2020, the band released Aces: A Quadrophonic Surround Companion for Negotiations which was meant to be played simultaneously with Negotiations for "an enhanced spatial experience".

Track listing

References

External links
 The Helio Sequence on Sub Pop
 Negotiations on Sub Pop

2012 albums
The Helio Sequence albums
Sub Pop albums